John Paul Clow Laband (born 18 March 1947 in Johannesburg) is a South African historian and writer, specialising in Anglo-Zulu and the First and Second Freedom Wars (Afrikaans: Eerste- en Tweede Vryheidsoorlog). He has taught at universities in South Africa, England, and Canada. In particular, he has been Professor of History at Wilfrid Laurier University, Canada, and a Research Associate of the University of KwaZulu-Natal.

Biography 
Laband has published many books about the military history of Southern Africa and the history of the Zulu nation and the Anglo-Zulu war of 1879 in particular. He is now Professor Emeritus at Wilfrid Laurier University]; and is a Life Member of Clare Hall, Cambridge University, England.

Bibliography (not exhaustive) 
 Fight Us in the Open; The Anglo-Zulu War Through Zulu Eyes, Pietermaritzburg, 1985
 Kingdom in Crisis: The Zulu Response to the British Invasion of 1879, 1992 
 Isandlwana, KwaZulu Monuments Council series, 1992
 Lord Chelmsford's Zululand Campaign 1878–1879, Army Records Society, 1994
 Rope of Sand: The Rise and Fall of the Zulu Kingdom in the Nineteenth Century, 1995, Jonathan Ball Publishers SA, 
 The Illustrated Guide to the Anglo-Zulu War, 2000, with Paul Thompson, University of KwaZulu-Natal Press,  
 The Atlas of the Later Zulu Wars, 1883–1888, 2001, University of KwaZulu-Natal Press,  
 The Transvaal Rebellion: The First Boer War 1880–1881, Taylor & Francis Ltd,  
 The Battle of Majuba Hill: The Transvaal Campaign, 1880–1881, Helion & Company,  
 Daily Lives Of Civilians in Wartime Africa, 2007, 
 Historical Dictionary of the Zulu Wars, Scarecrow Press,  
 Zulu Warriors: The Battle for the South African Frontier, Yale University Press,  
 The assassination of King Shaka, Jonathan Ball Publishers SA,  
 Zulu Identities: Being Zulu, Past and Present, with Benedict Carton and Jabulani Sithole, C Hurst & Co Publishers Ltd,  
 The eight Zulu kings: From Shaka to Goodwill Zwelithini, Jonathan Ball Publishers SA,  
 The Fall of Rorke's Drift: An Alternate History of the Anglo-Zulu War of 1879, Greenhill Books,  
 Bringers of War, Pen & Sword Books Ltd,  
 The A to Z of the Zulu Wars, Scarecrow Press, 
 with Timothy J. Stapleton, Encyclopedia of African Colonial Conflicts, 2 volumes, ABC-CLIO, Santa Barbara, California, 2016

Further reading 
 John Gooch, The Boer War: Direction, Experience, and Image, University of Leeds, p. 107-126, 2000
 Adrian Greaves, The Tribe That Washed Its Spears: The Zulus at War, Pen & Sword Military, 2013
 Harold E. Raugh, Jr., Anglo-Zulu War, 1879: A Selected Bibliography, Scarecrow Press, 2011
 Stephen M. Miller, Soldiers and Settlers in Africa: 1850 – 1918, 2009
 Keith Smith, Dead Was Everything: Studies in the Anglo-Zulu War, Frontline Books, 2014

References

External links 
 encyclopedia.com article
 Author page on Pen and Sword
 Library of Congress 

Military historians
1947 births
20th-century non-fiction writers
21st-century non-fiction writers
20th-century South African writers
21st-century South African writers
Living people
Academic staff of Wilfrid Laurier University